Arnulfo Palma Fuentebella (October 29, 1945 – September 9, 2020) was the Speaker of the Philippine House of Representatives from 2000 to 2001. He was also a representative of the 3rd (now 4th) district of Camarines Sur, more popularly known as the Partido district.

Early life and education
Arnulfo "Noli" Fuentebella was born on October 29, 1945, in Camarines Sur to former Representative and Governor Felix A. Fuentebella and Rita Palma. He was educated in his home province and spent most of his life in scouting until he reached Life Scout. At the age of 15, Fuentebella was a Philippine delegate to the 50th anniversary of the Boy Scouts of America in 1960. He is also a member of Alpha Phi Omega, a fraternity with deep roots in scouting. He studied law at the University of the Philippines in 1970 and graduated being the 7th in his class and passed the Bar Exams in 1971.

Career
After he passed the Bar Exams, Fuentebella pursued a career in law and banking. But after President Ferdinand E. Marcos imposed martial rule and called for elections to the Interim Batasang Pambansa (IBP), Fuentebella was chosen by the President to run in Congress to represent Partido. He subsequently won the elections and served as an assemblyman in the IBP from 1978 to 1984. However, he lost his bid for a seat in the 1984 Regular Batasang Pambansa and used the hiatus to practice law in New York, where he was admitted to the State Bar. Then the EDSA Revolution happened and President Marcos fled into exile. As the Fuentebellas had been identified with the Marcoses, he opted to sit out the Cory Aquino years.

In 1992, political allies asked Fuentebella to run again in Congress. He won three consecutive terms as Congressman (1992–2001).

Speakership
After then Speaker Manuel Villar, Jr. passed President Joseph Estrada's Articles of Impeachment to the Senate, Fuentebella was elected Speaker after Estrada's allies in the House of Representatives motioned to make all positions in the House vacant; Fuentebella won the nomination.

On January 20, 2001, during the Second EDSA Revolution, Estrada left the Malacañan Palace and Vice President Gloria Macapagal Arroyo was sworn to the presidency at the EDSA Shrine by Chief Justice Hilario Davide, Jr. Accompanying Davide were the chairs of the two houses of Congress, Senate President Aquilino Pimentel, Jr. and Speaker Fuentebella. Four days later, on January 24, the Arroyo allies mustered enough votes to unseat Fuentebella, replacing him with Quezon City representative Feliciano Belmonte.

Post-speakership
When Fuentebella had served the maximum three consecutive terms as a congressman, his son Felix William/Wimpy took over for one term (2001–2004). In the interim, Fuentebella took up post-graduate courses at the Kennedy School of Governance of Harvard University. He ran again for Congress and won three more consecutive terms (2004–2013). He was instrumental in the proposed creation of a new province to be called  Nueva Camarines, which will be composed of the fourth and fifth congressional Districts of Camarines Sur.

In the 14th Congress of the Philippines, Fuentebella was elected Deputy Speaker of the House of Representatives of the Philippines for Luzon.

In 2015, a complaint for misappropriation of public funds was lodged against Fuentebella and his wife before the Ombudsman.

In May 2016, Fuentebella won the election as Camarines Sur fourth district representative by just 740 votes. His opponent, singer Imelda Papin filed an electoral protest asking for a recount.

Death 
He died on September 9, 2020. His son said he succumbed to heart failure after battling kidney disease for almost two years.

External links
 Congress Profile

References

 Building Institutions: The Fuentebella Legacy by Coylee Gamboa
 Sunday Inquirer Magazine (Pushing for Nueva Camarines: A New Beginning)

1945 births
2020 deaths
20th-century Filipino lawyers
Speakers of the House of Representatives of the Philippines
Members of the House of Representatives of the Philippines from Camarines Sur
University of the Philippines alumni
Nationalist People's Coalition politicians
People from Pampanga
Arnulfo
Minority leaders of the House of Representatives of the Philippines
Deputy Speakers of the House of Representatives of the Philippines
Members of the Batasang Pambansa